D. Amaramoorthy is an Indian politician and incumbent Member of the Legislative Assembly of Tamil Nadu. He was elected to the Tamil Nadu legislative assembly from Ariyalur constituency as a Tamil Maanila Congress candidate in 1996 election, and as an Indian National Congress candidate in 2006 election.

References 

Living people
Tamil Maanila Congress politicians
Tamil Nadu MLAs 1996–2001
Tamil Nadu MLAs 2006–2011
Year of birth missing (living people)
Indian National Congress politicians from Tamil Nadu